Mordellistena nunenmacheri is a species of beetle in the genus Mordellistena of the family Mordellidae. It was described by Liljebald in 1918.

References

Beetles described in 1918
nunenmacheri